The Tennessee Volunteers men's golf team represents the University of Tennessee located in Knoxville, Tennessee. The Vols compete at the Division I level of the National Collegiate Athletic Association (NCAA) and the Southeastern Conference (SEC). The Vols currently rotate between 16 different golf courses located in the state of Tennessee, with their main headquarters at the Blackburn-Furrow Golf Clubhouse at Day Golf Practice Facility, less than a mile from campus. The current coach for the Volunteer men is Brennan Webb who is in his 5th season as Tennessee's head coach. Since the Vol's inaugural season in 1934 they have won three SEC championships, competed in 17 NCAA Championships, and participated in 26 NCAA Regionals.

History 
The Volunteers men's golf team began play in 1934 under coach James Walls. It would take forty-five years before the Vols would win their first conference title mainly under the terrific play of Jim Gallagher Jr. and Stuart Smith, who both finished in the top five of the tournament. That same year, the Vols reached their highest finish in the NCAA Championships, finishing in 6th place. In 1988, Tennessee had its deepest run in the NCAA singles competition when Tom Carr finished runner-up among the other individuals.

Jim Kelson era 
When Jim Kelson was hired in 1998, the Vols were just coming off a losing season that ended the three-year streak of NCAA Tournament appearances. In his first year, he led his team to 101 wins and a 5th-place finish in the SEC Tournament.

Kelson guided Tennessee to three straight NCAA Championship berths from 2009–2011. It was Tennessee's fifth NCAA Championship berth under Kelson since the 2003 season. He also guided the Vols to regional play for a school-record 15 consecutive seasons from 2000–2014. The 2007 season became a very memorable season for coach Kelson as he helped end a 17-year drought for the Vols in the SEC tournament by beating Alabama by two strokes to claim the SEC title. In the 2010 season, Kelson helped the Volunteers capture the Carpet Capital Collegiate Golf Tournament for the first time in school history. During his tenure, the Vols won 25 tournament championships, as well as several team individual accolades, and made 7 NCAA Championship appearances.

On June 12, 2018, Kelson announced he was retiring and stepped down from his position as head coach. Sean Pacetti served as the interim head coach until Brennan Webb, the former head golf coach at Middle Tennessee University, was hired on June 28, 2018 as the next head golf coach at Tennessee.

Brennan Webb era 
Under current head coach Brennan Webb, the Vols have posted four consecutive seasons with a win percentage above .600. Additionally, under the new SEC Championship match-play structure (which began in 2018), Webb has led the Vols to top 8 SEC finishes and the SEC Quarterfinals each year. The Vols have also made 3 NCAA Regionals in Webb's four years (the 2020 regionals were cancelled), and qualified for the 2021 NCAA Championships, ending a 7 year program drought.

Head coaches
Source

Note: Records for coaches James Walls and Lloyd Foree are incomplete for certain seasons.

Yearly record
Sources

*Note: The 2019–20 season was suspended in mid-March 2020 and later canceled due to the coronavirus (COVID-19) global health crisis.

Individual honors 
In the past 76 years of the Vols men's golf program four UT golfers have won SEC individual titles and 38 UT golfers have earned 58 All-SEC honors, in-addition to 20 Vols earning All-American honors.

All-Americans 

George Cadle – 1971
Tom Carr – 1988
Spencer Cross – 2020
Charlie Ford – 2006
Jim Gallagher Jr. – 1980, 1982
Oliver Goss – 2013
Bert Greene – 1964, 1965
John Hamarik – 1981
David Holmes – 2009
Kevin Janiga – 1980
Rick Lamb – 2013
Rhys Nevin – 2020
Mickey Mabry – 1972
Ross McGowan – 2005
Chris Paisley – 2009
Lorenzo Scalise – 2018
David Skinns – 2002, 2003, 2005
Stuart Smith – 1982, 1983
Mike Sposa – 1990, 1991
Robin Wingardh – 2011

Tour professionals 
Several former University of Tennessee golf players have played on major golf tours.

PGA Tour
George Cadle
Mike Emery, Jr.
Jim Estes
Jim Gallagher Jr.
Randy Glover
Bert Greene
John Hamarik
Rick Lamb
Tom McGinnis
Tad Rhyan
Mason Rudolph
Stuart Smith
Mike Sposa
Harry Taylor
European Tour
Ross McGowan
Chris Paisley
Web.com Tour
Tom Carr
Gibby Gilbert III
Andrew Pratt
Jake Reeves
Challenge Tour
Charlie Ford

Notable amateur victories 
Garrick Porteous, who played for the Volunteers from 2008–2012, won The Amateur Championship in 2013.

Mack and Jonnie Day Golf Facility 

Although the Vols men’s and women’s golf teams host their home matches at a variety of different courses in the state of Tennessee they have recently welcomed a new state of the art practice facility on campus where the team can practice all year round. The practice facility resides on a 28-acre lot across from the University's Medical Center and contains a 3-hole course plus putting green. The new facility opened in 2010 and was finished in 2019 with the Blackburn-Furrow Golf Clubhouse. The 8,300 square foot clubhouse features offices for both the men and women's teams, heated hitting bays for year-round practice, video training space, locker rooms, team lounges, over 1,200 square feet of outdoor deck spaces, and a virtual-putting green.

See also 
Tennessee Volunteers
Tennessee Volunteers women's golf

References

External links 
SECSports.com – Official website of the Southeastern Conference.